Brooks Ridge is a ridge in Howell County in the U.S. state of Missouri. Brooks Ridge is named after Jacob Brooks, a pioneer settler.

References

Landforms of Howell County, Missouri
Ridges of Missouri